Gordon Douglas Killam (1930-2020), known to friends as Doug Killam, was a Canadian scholar of African literature.

Life
Killam was born on August 26, 1930, the son of Harry and Margaret Killam of British Columbia. After working as a producer with CBC Television, he gained a PhD from University College London in 1964 and moved into academia. He travelled and taught in Africa, in Sierra Leone, Nigeria and Tanzania. He also taught at Canadian Universities, including UBC, the University of Alberta and University of Acadia. At the University of York he was the Foujnding Master of Bethune College. At the University of Guelph he made the Department of English a recognised centre of post-colonial studies. 

Predeceased by his wife Shelagh (née Anderson) in 1996, Killam died on November 17, 2020 of Parkinson's disease.

Works
 Africa in English fiction, 1874-1939. Ibadan: Ibadan University Press, 1968.
 The novels of Chinua Achebe. New York: Africana Pub. Corp., 1969.
 (ed.) African writers on African writing. Evanston: Northwestern University Press, 1972.
 An introduction to the writings of Ngugi. London: Heinemann Educational, 1980.
 The writing of East and Central Africa. London: Heinemann, 1984. 
 Critical perspectives on Ngugi wa Thiong'o. Washington: Three Continents Press, 1984.
 (ed. with Ruth Riwe) The companion to African literatures. Indiana University Press, 1999.
 Literature of Africa. Westport, Conn.: Greenwood Press, 2004.
 (ed. with Alicia L. Kerfoot) Student encyclopedia of African literature. Westport, Conn.: Greenwood Press, 2007.

References

1930 births
2020 deaths
Canadian academics
Scholars of African literature
Alumni of University College London
Academic staff of the University of Guelph